The Prisoners of War silver dollar is a commemorative coin issued by the United States Mint in 1994.  It was one of three coins in the 1994 Veterans Program, along with the Vietnam Veterans Memorial and Women in Military Service for America Memorial silver dollars.

Specifications
The following specifications are given by H.R. 3616.
 Weight: 
 Diameter: 
 Composition: 90% Silver, 10% Copper

See also
 List of United States commemorative coins and medals (1990s)
 United States commemorative coins

References

1994 establishments in the United States
Modern United States commemorative coins